The 2008 Southampton Council election took place on 1 May 2008 to elect members of Southampton Unitary Council in Hampshire, England. One third of the council was up for election and the Conservative Party gained overall control of the council from no overall control.

After the election, the composition of the council was:
Conservative 26
Labour 14
Liberal Democrat 8

Background
After the 2007 election the Conservative party took control as a minority administration after one Liberal Democrat councillor, Norah Goss, broke with her party to support the Conservatives. However, at the February 2008 budget meeting, the Labour and Liberal Democrats joined together to take control from the Conservatives.

Election result
The results saw the Conservative party win a majority on the council for the first time since 1984. The Conservatives gained 8 seats, 4 from Labour, 3 from the Liberal Democrats and 1 from an independent. Two 18-year-olds were among the Conservative winners, David Fuller taking Bitterne by 460 votes and Matthew Jones gaining Peartree by over 500 votes. Meanwhile, both the Labour leader of the council, June Bridle, in Sholing and the Liberal Democrat group leader, Adrian Vinson, in Portswood were among those who lost seats. The Conservative gains meant that they won 15 of the 17 seats contested to take a 4-seat majority with 26 seats, compared to 14 seats for Labour and 8 for the Liberal Democrats. Overall turnout in the election was 29.7%, down on the 30.3% in 2007 and varying between a low of 16.1% in Bargate and a high of 36.9% in Shirley.

The Conservative election success was put down to a combination of a rejection of the pact between the Labour and Liberal Democrat parties, anger at plans to charge people for parking outside their homes and the national issue of the abolition of the 10p rate of income tax. The results were also seen as indications for the next general election, with projections that the Conservatives could gain Southampton Test and Southampton Itchen constituencies from Labour on swings of 15.9% and 18.9% respectively, based on the local election results.

Following the election, Alec Samuels became the new Conservative leader of the council, Richard Williams became leader of the Labour group and Jill Baston took charge of the Liberal Democrat group.

Ward results

Bargate

Bassett

Bevois

Bitterne

Bitterne Park

Coxford

Freemantle

Harefield

Millbrook

Peartree

Portswood

Redbridge

Shirley

Sholing

Swaythling

Woolston

References

2008 English local elections
2008
2000s in Southampton